Panagiotis (Takis) Miliadis (26 September 1922 - 14 April 1985) was a Greek actor who is known for his comedic acting roles.

Biography
Takis Miliadis was born in Athens, Greece on 26 September 1922 into a theatrical and musical family. As his father, Nikos, was an actor in musical theatre, and his mother, Marika Anthopoulou, was an opera singer, he was intensely exposed to theatrical acting during his childhood. His parents wanted him to become a doctor. Although he attended the University Medical School and finished it, he preferred to study theatre and become an actor. He studied theatre during the German Occupation, attending the school of the great acting teachers Kostas Bastias and Dimitris Rontiris. Later, he was characterised as the 'Maurice Chevalier' of Greece. Miliadis married three times, first to Betty Moschona and then to Sasa Kazeli. Finally, he married Paraskevi Kollias and together they raised a son, Marios Miliadis.

Miliadis graduated from the University of Athens Medical School. Throughout his career, Miliadis has played roles in films and theatre. During his theatrical career, he earned great reviews from critics. At one point in his life he worked in Germany as a radio presenter, as part of a Greek-language broadcast.

Other than theatricals, films, radio and television broadcasts, he also did many refreshments in the Athens-Piraues time, with several number of reviews.  He was one of the starring hosts in the Sunday television show Haroumeni Kyriaki, Kyriaki horis sinnefa (Χαρούμενη Κυριακή, Κυριακή χωρίς σύννεφα = Happy Sunday, Sunday without Clouds) [1972, ΕΙΡΤ (today ERT1)] in which he performed theatrical sketches and acts.

Death
On 12 April 1985 Miliadis was involved in a car crash near his home in Ioannina. He survived the incident but he was left fatally wounded and he eventually succumbed to his injuries two days later.

Filmography

References 

Antonios Prekas, Like the Old Cinema (Σαν Παλιό Σινεμά = San Palio Cinema) Syghronoi Orizontes, 2003, pg 195-209

External links

1922 births
1986 deaths
Male actors from Athens
Greek male film actors
20th-century Greek male actors
Road incident deaths in Greece